Mindoro is an unincorporated community and census-designated place (CDP) in La Crosse County, Wisconsin, United States, in the town of Farmington. It is part of the La Crosse Metropolitan Statistical Area. It was first listed as a CDP prior to the 2020 census.

Geography
Mindoro is in northern La Crosse County, west of the geographic center of the town of Farmington. It sits in the Lewis Valley, south of Fleming Creek, at the entrance to Severson Coulee. County Highway C passes through the community, leading south  to West Salem and northeast  to Burr Oak.

Landmarks

The Bell Coulee Shelter, a rock shelter that was home to an ancient people, is southeast of Mindoro.

Notable people
Stanley R. Christianson, who posthumously was awarded the Medal of Honor for his role during the Korean War; born in Mindoro
Virgil Roberts, member of the Wisconsin State Assembly, born in Mindoro

Notes

Census-designated places in Wisconsin
Census-designated places in La Crosse County, Wisconsin
Unincorporated communities in Wisconsin
Unincorporated communities in La Crosse County, Wisconsin